The 2014 RideLondon–Surrey Classic (also known as the 2014 Prudential RideLondon–Surrey Classic for sponsorship reasons) was the 2nd edition of the RideLondon–Surrey Classic one-day cycling race. It was held on 10 August 2014 as a 1.HC category event within the 2014 UCI Europe Tour.

Route 

Following the inaugural running of the RideLondon–Surrey Classic the  route chosen for the 2014 edition incorporates a number of changes. The route features five categorised climbs and four intermediate sprint points.

The biggest changes relate to the Surrey section where local residents complained about the lengthy road closures put in place for the 2013 edition; where possible, the road closures for the 2014 edition will be managed by rolling road closures to limit the impact of the race on the local community.

The climb of Newlands Corner has been substituted for Staple Lane in order to route the race further from Guildford. The Leith Hill loop (traversed three times in 2013) has been replaced with two different loops centred on Dorking - riders will tackle Leith Hill (via Coldharbour) once and Denbies Wine Estate twice. The riders will race through the centre of Dorking four times, rather than once in 2013. With three categorised climbs in the vicinity and two intermediate sprint points in the town centre, Dorking was expected to become a focal point for spectators.

The route back to London, which still features the climb of Box Hill, was routed via Oxshott rather than Cobham. Minor changes to the route in Kingston upon Thames have been included in order to showcase the recently redeveloped ancient Market Place.

Both the climb of Staple Lane and Oxshott were used in the routes of the Olympic Road Cycling races in 2012.

Sprints classification 
There are four Intermediate Sprints that count towards the sprints classification:

Note that points are not awarded at the finish line.

King of the Mountains classification 
There are five categorised climbs that count towards the King of the Mountains classification:

Teams 
25 teams were invited to the 2014 RideLondon–Surrey Classic: 7 UCI ProTeams, 5 UCI Pro Continental Teams, 12 UCI Continental Teams along with the British national team.

Each of the 25 teams are due to enter six riders to the race, making up a starting peloton of 150 riders.

The 25 teams that will compete in the race are:

Race report 

The race was held in wet and windy conditions due to the passing of ex-Hurricane Bertha, with standing water and debris on the country lanes causing several punctures and accidents to riders. A 6-man breakaway formed through Richmond Park and contested the first 3 KOMs. Team Sky lead the peloton and upped the pace on the first climb of Denbies, fracturing the peloton and allowing the early break to be caught soon after. The second Denbies climb was animated by attacks from the likes of Phillip Gilbert and Gert Steegmans, creating a new lead group. Cannondale took up the attempts to pace the peloton back to the front through the final climb of Box Hill, but made little gain. As the leaders headed home for London, further increases in pace left a select group of 5 riders who would contest the victory. Gilbert and Julian Alaphilippe briefly went clear through Wimbledon, but Ben Swift, Adam Blythe and Kristijan Koren rode back to them to set up a final sprint down The Mall. Blythe, at the back of the line of riders, went first with a decisive sprint, Swift followed but was unable to beat him. Alaphilippe took third place, with the remnants of the break arriving soon after, with the peloton contesting a bunch sprint for top ten placings. Soon after the race Adam Blythe signed for the 2015 season for Orica Green-Edge.

Results

References

External links 
 

2014 UCI Europe Tour
2014 in British sport
2014
2014 in English sport
August 2014 sports events in the United Kingdom